is a train station in Shari, Hokkaidō, Japan.

Lines
Hokkaido Railway Company
Senmō Main Line Station B71

Adjacent stations

External links
 JR Hokkaido Naka-Shari Station information 

Stations of Hokkaido Railway Company
Railway stations in Hokkaido Prefecture
Railway stations in Japan opened in 1929